Martin Wambsgan (August 19, 1839 – January 17, 1911) was a German born Union Army soldier during the American Civil War. He received the Medal of Honor for gallantry during the Battle of Cedar Creek fought near Middletown, Virginia on October 19, 1864. The battle was the decisive engagement of Major General Philip Sheridan's Valley Campaigns of 1864 and was the largest battle fought in the Shenandoah Valley.

Wambsgan enlisted in the Union Army at Clyde, New York in October 1861. He re-enlisted in February 1864, and mustered out with his regiment in early 1866.

He was buried at Woodlawn Cemetery (Syracuse, NY), Section 21, Plot 97.

Medal of Honor citation
"The President of the United States of America, in the name of Congress, takes pleasure in presenting the Medal of Honor to Private Martin Wambsgan, United States Army, for extraordinary heroism on 19 October 1864, while serving with Company D, 90th New York Infantry, in action at Cedar Creek, Virginia. While the enemy were in close proximity, Private Wambsgan sprang forward and bore off in safety the regimental colors, the Color Bearer having fallen on the field of battle."

See also
List of American Civil War Medal of Honor recipients: T-Z

References

External links

 Martin Wambsgan grave at Woodlawn Cemetery (Syracuse, New York)

1839 births
1911 deaths
Bavarian emigrants to the United States
People of New York (state) in the American Civil War
Union Army soldiers
United States Army Medal of Honor recipients
German-born Medal of Honor recipients
American Civil War recipients of the Medal of Honor
People from Clyde, New York
Burials at Woodlawn Cemetery (Syracuse, New York)